Nalang is a village development committee in Dhading District in the Bagmati Zone of central Nepal. At the time of the National Population and Housing Census 2011 it had a population of 8067 and had 1876 houses in it.

References

Populated places in Dhading District